Pietro Travagli (born 28 April 1981) is an Italian rugby union player. He plays as a scrum-half.

He plays for Petrarca in the Top12.

He was called up to the Italy squad for the 2008 Six Nations Championship.

On 7 February 2011, he joined Aironi as a permit player for one month during the 2011 Six Nations Championship to fill in for the internationals called by Italy.

References

External links
Parma Rugby profile
RBS 6 Nations profile
Scrum.com profile
Pietro Travagli's Blog

1981 births
Living people
Sportspeople from Treviso
Italian rugby union players
Italy international rugby union players
Benetton Rugby players
Rugby Viadana players
Petrarca Rugby players
Aironi players
Rugby union scrum-halves